Sanja is a feminine given name. 

Sanja may also refer to:

Sanja (food), a Korean snack
Sanja (talk show), a Croatian television talk show produced by RTL Televizija
Sanja (woreda), a district in Amhara Region, Ethiopia
Sanja Matsuri (Three Shrine Festival), a Shinto festival in Tokyo